Lincoln is the second studio album by the band They Might Be Giants. It was released by Bar/None in 1988.  The album is named after John Linnell and John Flansburgh's boyhood home of Lincoln, Massachusetts. The album produced three singles—"Ana Ng", "They'll Need a Crane", and "Purple Toupee". It is included on Then: The Earlier Years, a compilation of the band's early material, in its entirety.

Style 
Lincoln maintains the range of musical styles present on the previous album, They Might Be Giants, and lyrically attempts to merge word play into narrative songs. Lyrical themes are broadened with the inclusion of songs detailing troubled romantic relationships ("Ana Ng", "They'll Need a Crane", "I've Got a Match"), and songs that verge on social or political satire ("Purple Toupee", "Kiss Me, Son of God"), whereas musically, the album explores a number of genres. For example, songs such as "Cowtown" and "Mr. Me" incorporate elements of sea shanties, while "Lie Still, Little Bottle" suggests a jazz influence.

Like previous releases, Lincoln does not utilize a full band arrangement. Instead, bass and drum tracks are entirely synthetic or sampled, with the exception of live drums on "Lie Still, Little Bottle". The drum tracks on the album were produced with an Alesis HR-16 drum machine. The album featured The Ordinaires, a nonet which was also signed to the Bar/None label, providing the arrangement for "Kiss Me, Son of God".

Release
As of 1999, the album had sold more than 200,000 copies, double the amount of the previous album.

Packaging 
The cover art depicts a shrine built by Brian Dewan, and photographed by Carol Kitman. Two slightly different versions of the cover photograph exist: one that was used for domestic releases, and another that was used for all releases outside the United States, with the exception of the Australian releases and Italian CD. The two men pictured behind the lecterns in the shrine are John Linnell's great-grandfather, Lewis T. Linnell (left) and Flansburgh's maternal grandfather, Brigadier General Ralph Hospital (right).

The artwork for the album was designed by John Flansburgh. The CD and LP labels feature diagrams of an accordion and accordion case, which were drawn by John Linnell.

Reception 

Lincoln received generally positive reviews. David Kissinger of Rolling Stone called the album "every bit as eccentric as its predecessor, and even more eclectic", though this was supplemented with the disclaimer that "[a]t times this penchant for the bizarre leads them into pointlessly sophomoric zaniness". Robert Christgau of The Village Voice described the band as "actively annoying even if intelligence is all you ask of your art-pop" and called the album's hooks "cleverness for cleverness's sake", nonetheless conceding that "damned clever they are." The album placed at number 78 on Pitchfork 100 Best Albums of the 1980s.

The album peaked at number 89 on the Billboard Top Pop Albums chart in 1989, spending 19 weeks on that chart. Its success led to They Might Be Giants' signing to the major label Elektra Records in 1990. Lincoln also generated the band's first charting single, "Ana Ng", which peaked at number 11 on the Billboard Modern Rock Tracks chart. The single, which was only released promotionally in the United States, also received positive attention. Christgau praised it as "a beyond-perfect tour de force about a Vietnamese woman they never got to meet". The other singles from the album, "They'll Need a Crane" and "Purple Toupee", failed to chart, though both songs and the track "Kiss Me, Son of God" received praise from Stewart Mason of Allmusic.

Track listing

2013 Australian bonus tracks

Personnel 
Track numbers refer to CD track list.

They Might Be Giants
John Flansburgh – lead vocals (2, 3, 5, 7, 10, 12, 13, 15, 17), electric guitar (1, 2, 4–6, 8–12, 14, 16), trumpet (3, 13), backing vocals (4, 5, 7, 8, 13, 14, 18), acoustic guitar (6, 7, 9, 14, 17), melodica (17)
John Linnell – lead vocals (1, 2, 4, 6, 8, 9, 11, 14–16, 18), backing vocals (1, 5, 9, 10, 11, 12, 16, 17), accordion (1, 4, 7, 8, 11, 15–17), autoharp (1, 9), clarinet (2), keyboard (2, 6, 9–14, 16–18), baritone saxophone (3, 15), bass saxophone (5, 10, 13), bass harmonica (7), tenor saxophone (15), banjo (16)

Additional musicians
Lisa Klapp – bridge monologue (1)
Kenneth Nolan – drums (3)
Unknown – glockenspiel (15)
The Ordinaires – arrangement (18)

Production
Brian Dewan – cover art
Al Houghton – engineer
Carol Kitman – cover photography
Bill Krauss – producer

References

External links
Lincoln at This Might Be A Wiki

1988 albums
Rough Trade Records albums
They Might Be Giants albums
Bar/None Records albums
Art pop albums